Karimpinpoovinakkare is a 1985 Malayalam film written by P. Padmarajan and directed by I. V. Sasi, starring Mammootty, Mohanlal, Bharat Gopy, Seema, and Urvashi. The film revolves around the life and revenge of a few villagers against each other.

Plot
The film opens with an illegal cockfighting competition held in a small village in central Kerala. Suddenly police enter and arrest Shivan and Suku for holding money betting. But on way, they are saved by village youths under Chellan, a local goon, who is also a close buddy of Shivan. Both Chellan and Shivan share a strong  friendship and are more like brothers. Chellan is in love with Shivan's younger sister and Shivan and his mom have given the green signal to it. Chandri, the sister of Shivan, is his everything and his whole happiness revolves around her. Bhadran, the younger brother of Chellan is too aggressive like him and picks fights for every silly reason. Its usually Shivan, who sorts out the fights that he picks every day. Things are going very smoothly until one day Chandri becomes pregnant. Chandri, in order to pacify Shivan reveals him that it is Chellan who is responsible for this, whereas it was Thampi, her neighbor, who was actually responsible. Shivan, in a sudden rage, kills Chellan and surrenders at the police station. Bhadran turns violent by this incident and vows to take revenge.

This incident changes the atmosphere in the village and Bhadran is now blind with hatred towards Shivan and his family. Shivan is sentenced to life imprisonment. Thampi then comes out and marries Chandri. Bhadran one night kills him and kidnaps Chandri and sells her along with the son to Pappachan, a pimp, who also runs a brothel. Shocked of his brutal way of revenge, Bhadran's mother curses him and dies. Though shocked over her reaction, Bhadran is not ready to give up his revenge.

Years have passed by. Shivan is released after seven years of sentence and reaches back to the village. He is a completely transformed man and is now in deep repentance for killing Chellan, who was more like an elder brother. He pleads Bhadran to reveal where Chandri is now, but Bhadran is not ready for that. One night, Bhadran is assaulted by his enemies, but is saved by Shivan. This incident opens his eyes, who informs his sister that he is going to bring Chandri back and plans to marry her. Bhadran reaches the brothel and asks Pappachan to hand her over, Pappachan doesn't obey. Bhadran picks a fight with Pappachan and his goons. Shivan, who was following Bhadran reaches there and he joins him in facing the goons. In the end of the fight, Bhadran is killed by Pappachan. Shivan beats Pappachan and is about to kill him, but stops on request of Chandri. Bhadran makes his last breath lying in the lap of Shivan.

Cast 

 Mammootty as Shivan
 Mohanlal as Bhadran            
 Bharath Gopi as Chellannan (Brother of Bhadran & Gauri)
 Seema as Gauri (Sister of Bhadran & Chellannan)
 Urvashi as Chandrika (Sister of Shivan)
 Ravindran as Thampi (Husband of Chandrika)
 Vincent as Police Inspector
 Captain Raju as Pappachan
 Lalu Alex as Vasu
 Meena
 Kundara Johnny as Kunjachan
 Jagannatha Varma as Advocate Aravindakshan
 Maniyanpilla Raju
 Valsala Menon
 Sukumari
 Kaviyoor Ponnamma as Bhadran's mother

Release
The film was released on 14 November 1985.

Box office
The film was commercial success.

Soundtrack
The music was composed by Shyam and the lyrics were written by Bichu Thirumala.

References

External links

Films with screenplays by Padmarajan
1980s Malayalam-language films
1983 films
Cockfighting in film
Films shot in Kerala
Films directed by I. V. Sasi